Johanne Bégin (born October 21, 1971 in Vanier, Quebec) is a Canadian water polo player.

Bégin was a member of the fifth-placed women's water polo team at the 2000 Summer Olympics, and of the bronze-medal-winning team at the 2001 world championships in Fukuoka, Japan.

See also
 Canada women's Olympic water polo team records and statistics
 List of World Aquatics Championships medalists in water polo

External links
 

1971 births
Living people
Canadian female water polo players
Water polo players at the 2000 Summer Olympics
Water polo players at the 2004 Summer Olympics
Olympic water polo players of Canada
Water polo players from Quebec City
French Quebecers
World Aquatics Championships medalists in water polo
Pan American Games silver medalists for Canada
Pan American Games medalists in water polo
Water polo players at the 2003 Pan American Games
Medalists at the 2003 Pan American Games